The Bernoulli family of Basel was a patrician family, notable for having produced  eight mathematically gifted academics who, among them, contributed substantially to the development of mathematics and physics during the early modern period.

History
Originally from Antwerp, a branch of the family relocated to Basel in 1620.
While their origin in Antwerp is certain, proposed earlier connections with the Dutch family Bornouilla (Bernoullie), or with the Castilian family de Bernuy (Bernoille, Bernouille), are uncertain.

The first known member of the family was Leon Bernoulli (d. 1561),  a doctor in Antwerp, at that time part of the Spanish Netherlands. His son, Jacob, emigrated to Frankfurt am Main in 1570 to escape from the Spanish persecution of the Protestants. Jacob's grandson, a spice trader, also named Jacob, moved to Basel, Switzerland in 1620, and was granted citizenship in 1622. His son,  (Nicolaus, 1623–1708), Leon's great-great-grandson, married Margarethe Schönauer.

Notable academic members
Niklaus had four sons, of whom Johann and Hieronymus became the progenitors of the "greater" and the "lesser" branches of the family, respectively. The "greater" branch later became related by marriage to the prominent French academic dynasty, the Curie family, through Johann Bernoulli (1667–1748). The four sons of Niklaus were:
 Jacob Bernoulli (1654–1705; also known as James or Jacques), mathematician after whom Bernoulli numbers are named, and author of the early probability text Ars Conjectandi
 Nicolaus Bernoulli (1662–1716), painter and alderman of Basel
 Johann Bernoulli (1667–1748; also known as Jean), mathematician and early adopter of infinitesimal calculus
 Hieronymus Bernoulli (1669–1760), m.  Catharina Ebneter

In addition to Jacob and Johann, the Bernoulli family of mathematicians is generally taken to include:
 Nicolaus I Bernoulli (1687–1759), son of Nicolaus, mathematician, worked on curves, differential equations, and probability; originator of the St. Petersburg paradox
 Nicolaus II Bernoulli (1695–1726), son of Johann
 Daniel Bernoulli (1700–1782), son of Johann, developer of Bernoulli's principle and originator of the concept of expected utility for resolving the St. Petersburg paradox
 Johann II Bernoulli (1710–1790; also known as Jean), son of Johann, mathematician and physicist
 Johann III Bernoulli (1744–1807; also known as Jean), son of Johann II, astronomer, geographer and mathematician
 Jacob II Bernoulli (1759–1789; also known as Jacques), son of Johann II, physicist and mathematician

Several more recent prominent scholars are also descended from the family, including:
 (1831–1913), art historian and archaeologist; noted for his Römische Ikonographie (1882 onwards) on Roman Imperial portraits 
Ludwig Bernoully (1873–1928), German architect in Frankfurt
 Hans Bernoulli (1876–1959), architect and designer of the Bernoullihäuser in Zurich and Grenchen SO
 Elisabeth Bernoulli (1873–1935), suffragette and campaigner against alcoholism

The surname survives in Switzerland, with ten entries in the white pages for the city of Basel as of 2018.

Family Tree of the Basler Bernoullis

Named for members of the family

 Bernoulli differential equation
 Bernoulli distribution
 Bernoulli number
 Bernoulli polynomials
 Bernoulli process
 Bernoulli trial
 Bernoulli's principle
 Bernoulli's triangle

References

External links

 Family tree at the MacTutor History of Mathematics archive.
 David Darling Encyclopedia of Science Bernoulli family 

 
History of Basel
History of mathematics
Patriciate of Basel
Scientific families
Families of Belgian ancestry